Agnathosia is a genus of moths belonging to the family Tineidae.

Species:
Some species of this genus are:
Agnathosia byrsinopa  (Meyrick, 1933) (from Sierra Leone and Sénégal)
Agnothosia propulsatella  Rebel, 1892
Agnathosia mendicella  Hübner, 1796) (from Europe/Russia)
Agnathosia nana  Bippus, 2020
Agnathosia obisaggitalis Xiao & Li, 2011 (from China and Japan)
Agnathosia sandoensis  Jonasson, 1977 (from Sweden)

References

Amsel, 1954. Neue oder bemerkenswerte Kleinschmetterlinge aus Österreich, Italien, Sardinien und Corsica. - Zeitschrift der Wiener Entomologischen Gesellschaft 39: 5-17.

Tineidae
Tineidae genera